Simson Provincial Park is a provincial park in British Columbia, Canada.

The Simson Provincial Park is located on the southern half of South Thormanby Island and is opposite Halfmoon Bay, British Columbia. The park is only accessible by sea. It takes its name from pioneer Calvert Simson whose family donated the land in order to create the park.

External links

 Simson Provincial Park at BC Parks

Provincial parks of British Columbia
Sunshine Coast Regional District
Protected areas established in 1986
1986 establishments in British Columbia
Marine parks of Canada